Sis Hopkins is a 1941 American comedy film directed by Joseph Santley and written by Jack Townley, Milt Gross and Edward Eliscu. Starring Judy Canova, Bob Crosby, Charles Butterworth, Jerry Colonna, Susan Hayward and Katharine Alexander, it was released on April 12, 1941, by Republic Pictures.

A rare example of a film with an Academy Award nomination that was withdrawn.

Cast
Judy Canova as Sis Hopkins
Bob Crosby as Jeff Farnsworth
Charles Butterworth as Horace Hopkins
Jerry Colonna as Professor
Susan Hayward as Carol Hopkins
Katharine Alexander as Clara Hopkins
Elvia Allman as Ripple
Carol Adams as Cynthia
Lynn Merrick as Phyllis
Mary Ainslee as Vera De Vere
Charles Coleman as Butler
Andrew Tombes as Mayor
Charles Lane as Rollo
Byron Foulger as Joe
Betty Blythe as Mrs. Farnsworth
Frank Darien as Jud
Adrian Morris as Bodyguard

References

External links 
 

1941 films
1940s English-language films
American comedy films
1941 comedy films
Republic Pictures films
Films directed by Joseph Santley
American black-and-white films
1940s American films